Jean Mailland (26 April 1937 – 9 May 2017) was a French film director, novelist, playwright and songwriter.

Early life
Jean Mailland was born as Jean Michaud on 26 April 1937 in Aix-les-Bains. He graduated from the Conservatoire national supérieur de musique et de danse de Lyon. He also attended Roger Planchon's classes at the Théâtre de la Comédie in Lyon and Henri Bose's classes in Paris.

Career
Mailland began his career as a television film director at Studios de Buttes Chaumont. He was an assistant to Claude Barma, André Michel and Jean-Jacques Vierne. He also directed feature films. He wrote many songs for his wife, Anne Prucnal.

Mailland was the author of novels and plays. He also composed poetry.

Personal life and death
Mailland was married to Anna Prucnal. He died on 9 May 2017.

Works

Poems
 Tout merveilleusement (HC, 1955)
 Le Présent définitif (Le Bruit des autres, 2005)
 Ombres des choses naturelles (Le Bruit des autres, 2006)
 Village. État de lieux (Le Bruit des autres, 2013)

Novels
 Armand Gatti, l'enclos (Fayard, 1961)
 Les Compagnons de Baal (Solar, 1967)
 La Tête à la renverse, roman (Calmann-Lévy, 1971)
 Moi qui suis née à Varsovie (co-authored with Anna Prucnal, Neige/L'Archipel, 2002)
 Déclaration d’absence (Neige/Le Bruit des autres, 2004)
 Chansons et contre-chansons pour Anna (Éditions l'Amourier, 2004)
 Le Journal des arbres (Le Bruit des autres, 2009)

Plays
 Les Mauvais Coups (1974)
 Travail (1986)
 La Brûlée vive (1988)
 Face à face (1989)
 Noyés (1989)
 Guernika 1937, une revue lyrique (1996)
 Déserteur (1997)

References

1937 births
2017 deaths
People from Aix-les-Bains
French songwriters
Male songwriters
French film directors
French male novelists
20th-century French novelists
21st-century French novelists
20th-century French dramatists and playwrights
21st-century French dramatists and playwrights
French male poets
20th-century French poets
21st-century French poets
21st-century French male writers
20th-century French male writers